Paisley is a constituency of the Scottish Parliament (Holyrood) covering the town of Paisley in Renfrewshire council area. It elects one Member of the Scottish Parliament (MSP) by the first past the post method of election. It is also one of ten constituencies in the West Scotland electoral region, which elects seven additional members, in addition to ten constituency MSPs, to produce a form of proportional representation for the region as a whole.

The constituency was created for 2011 Scottish Parliament election, and covers parts of the former constituencies of Paisley North and Paisley South. It has been held by George Adam of the Scottish National Party (SNP) since its formation.

Electoral region 

The other nine constituencies of the West Scotland region are Clydebank and Milngavie, Cunninghame North, Cunninghame South, Dumbarton, Eastwood, Greenock and Inverclyde, Renfrewshire North and West, Renfrewshire South and Strathkelvin and Bearsden.

The region covers part of the Argyll and Bute council area, the East Dunbartonshire council area, the East Renfrewshire council area, the Inverclyde council area, North Ayrshire council area, the Renfrewshire council area and the West Dunbartonshire council area.

Constituency boundaries and council area 

Renfrewshire is represented in the Scottish Parliament by three constituencies: Paisley, Renfrewshire North and West and Renfrewshire South.

The electoral wards of the Paisley constituency are:

In full:
Paisley Northeast and Ralston
Paisley East and Central
Paisley Southeast
Paisley Southwest
In part: Paisley Northwest (shared with Renfrewshire North and West)

Constituency profile 
The constituency covers most of the town of Paisley, the Gallowhill area in the northeast of the town lying in the neighbouring seat of Renfrewshire North and West. Paisley is often considered the biggest town in Scotland, and gave its name to the distinctive kidney-shaped "paisley pattern" and the Paisley shawl. Textile and thread manufacture were long the mainstay of Paisley's industry, due to the damp climate and plentiful water, and by the 19th century, the town was a major centre for the weaving industry.

Paisley has a long association with political Radicalism, highlighted by its involvement in the Radical War of 1820, with striking weavers being instrumental in the protests. By 1993, all of Paisley's mills had closed, although they are memorialised in the town's museums and civic history. The decline of industry in the town has led to urban recession, and in 2006, the district of Ferguslie Park was named one of Scotland's most deprived areas by what was then the Scottish Executive. In 2015, the town launched its bid to become UK City of Culture in 2021, becoming one of the five shortlisted candidates, before eventually losing out to Coventry.

The constituency features four railway stations, a major hospital and several notable churches. Most noticeable among the buildings of Paisley is Paisley Abbey in the centre of the town, which dates from the 12th century. Nearby lies St Mirin's Cathedral which is the seat of the Catholic Bishop of Paisley.

Members

Elections

2020s

2010s

References

External links

Politics of Paisley, Renfrewshire
Scottish Parliament constituencies and regions from 2011
Constituencies of the Scottish Parliament
Constituencies established in 2011
2011 establishments in Scotland